Let Me Know is a song by Japanese electronic musician Towa Tei, featuring singer Chara on vocals. It debuted at #34 on the Japanese Oricon album charts, and charted for four weeks. It did substantially better on the J-Wave airplay charts, charting in the top 30 for eight weeks.

Let Me Know was used as the ending theme song for the variety show Hey! Hey! Hey! Music Champ and The Adventures of Laughing Dog: YARANEVA!!.

The song also appears on the 1999 remix album Lost Control Mix with the remix Let Me Know (Mighty Bop Remix) (remixed by Bob Sinclar), as well as the original version appearing on Tei's 2001 best-of album, Towa Tei Best.

Track listing

Single

Chart rankings

Oricon Charts (Japan)

References 

Towa Tei songs
Chara (singer) songs
1999 singles
Songs written by Towa Tei
Japanese-language songs
1999 songs
Songs written by Chara (singer)
Warner Music Group singles
Contemporary R&B songs